Ahmedabad West Lok Sabha constituency is one of the 26 Lok Sabha (lower house of Indian parliament) constituencies in Gujarat, a state in western India. This constituency was created as a part of the implementation of delimitation of parliamentary constituencies in 2008. This seat is reserved for Scheduled Castes (SC). It first held elections in 2009 and its first member of parliament (MP) was Dr.Kirit Premjibhai Solanki of the Bharatiya Janata Party (BJP). As of latest elections in 2019, Dr.Solanki represents this constituency.

Assembly segments
As of 2014, Ahmedabad West Lok Sabha constituency comprises seven Vidhan Sabha (legislative assembly) segments. These are:

Members of Parliament
 Elections until 2008, See Ahmedabad parliamentary constituency.
 This seat came into existence from 2009 elections.

Election results

2019

2014

2009

See also
 Ahmedabad Lok Sabha constituency
 Ahmedabad District
 List of Constituencies of the Lok Sabha

References

Lok Sabha constituencies in Gujarat
Government of Ahmedabad
Constituencies established in 2008